Army of One may refer to:
Army of One (recruiting slogan), the former U.S. Army recruiting slogan

Music
Army of One (album), a 2006 album by Riot
"Army of One", a song by Phish from the 2004 album Undermind
"Army of One", a song by Cass Fox from the 2005 Come Here (Cass Fox album)
"Army of One", a song by Coldplay from the 2015 album A Head Full of Dreams

Film and television
"Army of One" (The Sopranos), an episode of The Sopranos
"The Army Of One", an episode of Voltron Force
Joshua Tree (1993 film), a film by Vic Armstrong also known as Army of One
Army of One (2016 film), an American comedy film
Army Of One (2020 film), an American action thriller film by Stephen Durham

See also
One Man Army (disambiguation)